Goplana may refer to:

Goplana, mythical Slavic being in Balladyna (drama), 1839
Goplana, Konin County
Goplana (opera), opera by Władysław Żeleński  1896